The Halifax Nova Scotia Temple is the 64th operating temple of the Church of Jesus Christ of Latter-day Saints (LDS Church).

History
On October 12, 1998, Jay E. Jensen led a group of 700 members in a groundbreaking ceremony on Thanksgiving Day.

When the temple was opened to the public, prior to the dedication, about 8,000 people toured the building. Because of mechanical problems with LDS Church president Gordon B. Hinckley's plane, the Halifax temple dedication was delayed a day so that it was dedicated on the same day as the Regina Saskatchewan Temple. This marked the first time two LDS temples were dedicated on the same day. Hinckley opted to stay in Cole Harbour while apostle Boyd K. Packer went to Regina.

Hinckley dedicated the Halifax temple on November 14, 1999.

In 2020, the Halifax Nova Scotia Temple was closed in response to the coronavirus pandemic.

See also

 Temple (Latter Day Saints)
 List of temples of The Church of Jesus Christ of Latter-day Saints
 List of temples of The Church of Jesus Christ of Latter-day Saints by geographic region
 Comparison of temples of The Church of Jesus Christ of Latter-day Saints
 Temple architecture (Latter-day Saints)
 The Church of Jesus Christ of Latter-day Saints in Canada

Additional reading

References

External links
Halifax Nova Scotia Temple Official site
Halifax Nova Scotia Temple at ChurchofJesusChristTemples.org

Temples (LDS Church) completed in 1999
Religious buildings and structures in Nova Scotia
Temples (LDS Church) in Canada
Churches in Halifax, Nova Scotia
20th-century Latter Day Saint temples
1999 establishments in Nova Scotia
20th-century religious buildings and structures in Canada